Rybalchenko is a surname of Ukrainian origin. It is a patronymic derivation  from surname/nickname Rybalka, the latter literally meaning "fisherman" In Ukrainian. Notable people with this surname include:

 Stepan Rybalchenko (1903–1986), Soviet Air Force colonel-general
 Vadym Rybalchenko (born 1988), Ukrainian footballer

See also
 

Ukrainian-language surnames
Occupational surnames
Patronymic surnames